Shirazabad (also Romanized as Shīrāzābād) is a village in Zibad Rural District, Kakhk District, Gonabad County, Razavi Khorasan Province, Iran. At the 2006 census, its population was 43, in 22 families.

References 

Populated places in Gonabad County